The 2013 Asian Indoor and Martial Arts Games, officially 4th Asian Indoor and Martial Arts Games and also known as Incheon 2013, was a pan-continental event held in Incheon, South Korea from 29 June to 6 July 2013 that served as a dress-rehearsal for the upcoming 2014 Asian Games, which was also held in the same city. It was the first event to be held under the "Asian Indoor and Martial Arts Games" name following the merger of two OCA events – Asian Indoor Games and Asian Martial Arts Games, inherited the edition numeral of the former. Doha, Qatar was initially scheduled to host the 4th Asian Indoor Games in 2011, but withdrawn in June 2008 due to "unforeseen circumstances", with the Olympic Council of Asia (OCA) chose Incheon instead as a replacement and postponed the games to 2013.

Marketing
The logo of the Games is a brush image of a Korean traditional 'Giwa' (Tile) Roof that resembles people – “人” (Hanja or Chinese character for "인" (In)) holding hands, the initial of Asia “A”, and the Incheon Bridge. The wordmark ‘incheon 2013’ under the roof resembles the athletes from countries of the region that compete in various sports of the games. Similar to the Asian Games, the event's mascots were three spotted seals named Barame, Chumuro, and Vichuan and the event's motto was Diversity Shines Here. (See 2014 Asian Games#Marketing)

Venues
Nine different venues were used for these Games: Most of the following would also be used for the 2014 Asian Games.

 Incheon Samsan World Gymnasium – opening and closing ceremonies. It will also host dancesport and esports;
 Anyang Hogye Gymnasium – bowling;
 Songdo Global University Campus and Dongbu Student Gymnasium – futsal;
 Sangnoksu Gymnasium – indoor kabaddi and kurash;
 Dowon Aquatics Center – short-course (25m) swimming;
 Songdo Convensia – cue sports (billiard sports);
 Yonsei International Campus – chess and baduk (Go)
 Dowon Gymnasium – kickboxing and muaythai

Participating nations
All 45 member countries of the Olympic Council of Asia were invited to compete at these Games, with only 43 OCA countries taking pare in the 2013 games. North Korea and Timor-Leste declined to send their athletes to these Games. Indian athletes participated the Games under the Olympic flag because the Indian Olympic Association was suspended.

Sports
A total of twelve sports were approved for the 2013 Asian Indoor and Martial Arts Games.

Calendar

Medal table

Doping
What follows is a list of all the athletes that have tested positive for a banned substance during the Games. Any medals listed were revoked.

References

External links
Official website
 World Muay Thai Federation on Asian Indoor & Martial Arts Games

 
Asian Indoor and Martial Arts Games
Asian Indoor and Martial Arts Games
Asian Indoor and Martial Arts Games
Asian Indoor and Martial Arts Games
Sports competitions in Incheon
Multi-sport events in South Korea
International sports competitions hosted by South Korea
2013 festivals in South Korea